The 2018–19 LEB Oro season was the 23rd season of the Spanish basketball second league. It started on 5 October 2018 with the first round of the regular season and ended on 2 June 2019 with the final.

Format changes
On 2 June 2018, the General Assembly of the Spanish Basketball Federation agreed some changes in the competition format:

 The three last qualified teams will be relegated to LEB Plata.
 The semifinals and the final will be played as a Final Four, where the winner will be promoted to Liga ACB.

Teams

Promotion and relegation (pre-season)
A total of 18 teams contested the league, including 14 sides from the 2017–18 season, two relegated from the 2017–18 ACB and two promoted from the 2017–18 LEB Plata.

Teams relegated from Liga ACB
RETAbet Bilbao Basket
Real Betis Energía Plus

Teams promoted from LEB Plata
Covirán Granada
Real Canoe NC

Venues and locations

Personnel and sponsorship

Managerial changes

Regular season

League table

Positions by round
The table lists the positions of teams after completion of each round. In order to preserve chronological evolvements, any postponed matches are not included in the round at which they were originally scheduled, but added to the full round they were played immediately afterwards. For example, if a match is scheduled for round 13, but then postponed and played between rounds 16 and 17, it will be added to the standings for round 16.

Results

Playoffs

Source: FEB

Copa Princesa de Asturias
The Copa Princesa de Asturias was played on 8 February 2019, by the two first qualified teams after the end of the first half of the season (round 17). The champion of the cup would have played the playoffs against the ninth qualified if it has finished the league between the second and the fifth qualified.

Teams qualified

Game

Final standings

Individual statistics

Points

Source: FEB

Rebounds

Source: FEB

Assists

Source: FEB

Efficiency

Source: FEB

Awards
All official awards of the 2018–19 LEB Oro season.

MVP

Source:

All-LEB Oro Team

Source:

Final Four MVP

Source:

Copa Princesa de Asturias MVP

Source:

Best Coach

Source:

Player of the round

Source: FEB

References and notes

External links
 Official website 

LEB
LEB Oro seasons
Second level Spanish basketball league seasons
2018–19 in European second tier basketball leagues